Nils Mauritz Hald (October 12, 1897 – July 14, 1963) was a Norwegian actor.

Hald was born in Kristiansand, Norway, the son of the bookbinder Johan Christian Thor Hald (1865–1902) and Karen Marie Gundersen (1864–1944). He was married to the actress Ragnhild Hald from 1922 to 1938.

Hald made his film debut in Rasmus Breistein's 1921 film Felix. A year later he appeared in Farende folk, but then did not appear in any further films until 1936. He then appeared in a number of other roles until 1961. Hald was also engaged with the Norwegian Theater in the 1940s and 1950s.

Filmography
1921: Felix as Torleif, the pilot's son
1922: Farende folk as Jonas Værn
1936: Dyrk jorden! as Hjalmar
1946: Vi vil leve as Harald's father
1946: Om kjærligheten synger de as Drøbak
1950: To mistenkelige personer
1956: Roser til Monica as the gardener
1958: Høysommer as Trond

Television
1961: Går ut i kveld as Mr. Ryan

References

External links
 
 Nils Hald at the Swedish Film Database

1897 births
1963 deaths
Norwegian male stage actors
Norwegian male film actors
Norwegian male silent film actors
20th-century Norwegian male actors
People from Kristiansand